Rankica Šarenac (born 27 June 1974 in Sarajevo, SFR Yugoslavia) is a former Bosnian and Slovenian basketball player and basketball coach.

Career statistics

WNBA

Source

Regular season

|-
| align="left" | 2000
| align="left" | Phoenix
| 20 || 0 || 7.1 || .523 || 1.000 || .630 || 1.5 || .4 || .0 || .1 || .9 || 3.2

References

1974 births
Living people
Basketball players from Sarajevo
Slovenian women's basketball players
Centers (basketball)
Slovenian women's basketball coaches
Slovenian expatriate basketball people in Spain
Slovenian expatriate basketball people in the United States
Slovenian expatriate basketball people in France
Slovenian expatriate basketball people in the Czech Republic
Slovenian expatriate basketball people in Italy
Slovenian expatriate basketball people in Poland
Mediterranean Games gold medalists for Bosnia and Herzegovina
Yugoslav women's basketball players
Bosnia and Herzegovina expatriate basketball people in Slovenia
Bosnia and Herzegovina emigrants to Slovenia
Bosnia and Herzegovina women's basketball players